Angelina Romanovna Golikova (born 17 September 1991) is a Russian speed skater. She competed at the 2014 World Sprint Speed Skating Championships in Nagano, and at the 2014 Winter Olympics in Sochi.

Records

Personal records

World Cup podiums

Overall rankings

References

External links

1991 births
Living people
Speed skaters at the 2014 Winter Olympics
Speed skaters at the 2018 Winter Olympics
Speed skaters at the 2022 Winter Olympics
Medalists at the 2022 Winter Olympics
Olympic medalists in speed skating
Olympic silver medalists for the Russian Olympic Committee athletes
Russian female speed skaters
Olympic speed skaters of Russia
Universiade medalists in speed skating
Speed skaters from Moscow
World Single Distances Speed Skating Championships medalists
Universiade bronze medalists for Russia
Competitors at the 2013 Winter Universiade